Gideon Jung (born 12 September 1994) is a German professional footballer of African origin who currently plays as a defender or defensive midfielder for Bundesliga club Greuther Fürth.

Club career
He made his professional debut on 13 September 2013 for Rot-Weiß Oberhausen in a Regionalliga West match against Sportfreunde Lotte. On 5 April 2014, Jung scored his first professional goal in a game against SC Wiedenbrück 2000. He went on to make 22 appearances in the 2013-14 season before transferring to Hamburger SV on 1 July 2014.

Upon arrival at Hamburger SV, Jung was immediately sent down to the second team, Hamburger SV II. On 26 July 2014, Gideon made his debut for the side in a 4–0 rout of Goslarer SC 08. On 26 October 2014, Gideon scored 1 of 10 goals for the team during a 10–0 rout of FT Braunschweig. During the 2014–15 season, Gideon appeared 23 times for Hamburger SV II, but wasn't able to make his debut for Hamburger SV.

Having been called up to Hamburger SV, Jung started the 2015–16 on the first team, making his debut on Matchday 1 versus FC Bayern Munich.

International career
On 21 August 2015, Jung was invited by Horst Hrubesch, coach of the German U-21 national team for the first time when he was nominated for the test match against Denmark and for the European Championship qualifier against Azerbaijan. He could not participate in the game due to a hit on the calf. On 26 August 2016, Jung was again invited by Stefan Kuntz, Hrubesch's successor. Again he could not participate because of an injury.

Career statistics

Honours
Germany
 UEFA European Under-21 Championship: 2017

References

External links
kicker profile 

1994 births
Living people
Association football midfielders
German footballers
Germany youth international footballers
Germany under-21 international footballers
German sportspeople of Ghanaian descent
Rot-Weiß Oberhausen players
Hamburger SV players
Hamburger SV II players
SpVgg Greuther Fürth players
Footballers from Düsseldorf
Bundesliga players
2. Bundesliga players
Regionalliga players